Airwallex is a multinational financial technology company offering financial services and software as a service (SaaS). Founded in 2015 in Melbourne, Australia, the company is a financial services platform providing foreign exchange transactions to businesses through a proprietary banking network and its API. It also provides bank accounts among other services. It is Australia's third technology unicorn company overall. With a valuation of US$5.5 billion, as of 2021, the company processed $20 billion at an annualized volume.

History

Founding and growth (2015–2018)
Airwallex was created in 2015 in Melbourne, Australia by five co-founders. At the time, software engineer Jack Zhang and architect Max Li had invested into a coffee shop which they were operating in Melbourne. While importing supplies from China, they found cross-border payments to be costly and time-consuming for a small company. Zhang, involved in designing the digital forex trading platforms for the National Australia Bank (NAB) and The Australia and New Zealand Banking Group Limited (ANZ), was inspired to provide a simple, cheaper service to small and midsize businesses. Zhang and Li partnered with Lucy Liu and Xijing Dai, fellow alumni from the University of Melbourne, as well as Ki-Lok Wong. With the founders investing a combined $1 million, roles included Zhang as CEO, Liu as president, Li as head of design, Dai as chief technology officer, and Wong as principal architect.

The Airwallex platform was developed to lower consumer costs on foreign exchange rates, and was launched in a closed beta trial stage in 2015. The company built a proprietary network with banks, such as Standard Chartered, DBS Bank and the Industrial and Commercial Bank of China, to handle local transactions. ANZ began providing transactional services to Airwallex in 2017, with both MasterCard's Send platform and Tencent's WeRemit service powered by Airwallex. Airwallex closed the "second-largest fundraising round in Australian start-up history" in July 2018, netting $80 million In 2018, Airwallex moved headquarters from Melbourne to Hong Kong and turned down a US$1 billion acquisition bid by Stripe.

International expansion (2019–present)
After a round of funding in March 2019 brought in $100 million from investors such as DST Global, Sequoia Capital China, and Hillhouse Capital, Airwallex reached a valuation of US$1 billion, and became the "quickest company in Australia to reach unicorn status," as well as Australia's third technology unicorn overall. Airwallex in September 2019 received a "no-consent letter" from the Hong Kong Police Organised and Serious Crimes Ordinance, freezing $26 million in the accounts of two former clients over suspicions of money laundering. After Airwallex applied to Hong Kong's High Court for judicial review, in 2021, $18.2 million was released back to Airwallex after the defrauded firm, Ciklus, confirmed to police that Airwallex "was never involved in the fraud perpetrated against it."

Press reported in February 2020 that instead of focusing largely on forex transfers, Airwallex was aiming to become a "neobank" akin to Salesforce, specifically the "AWS of financial services." After the National Australia Bank cancelled transactional banking services for Airwallex customers in 2018 as "part of a post-royal commission policy to limit exposure to low-revenue money services businesses," in 2020, the National Australia Bank again approached the company about collaborating, only to deem Airwallex's offer "not sufficient". At the time, NAB continued to provide payroll and rental payment services to Airwallex. In 2021, Airwallex released a debit card with Visa in Hong Kong and then in the United States, in February 2022.

In May 2021, Airwallex received a license in the Netherlands, giving them access to the European market. Airwallex started operations in the US that August, secured a license in Malaysia in September 2021, and in early 2022, launched in Singapore. In November 2021, it raised an additional US$100 million, reaching a new valuation of $5.5 billion and bringing the total funds raised since 2015 to $802 million. In late 2021 it had 1000 employees in 19 locations.

Products and services
Airwallex uses a proprietary banking network to handle local transactions, with machine learning in its SaaS products "[enabling] customers to... send money through local and international clearing networks" in around 130 countries. Beyond forex services, other services include online payments acceptance, bank accounts, borderless cards, and a suite of application programming interfaces (APIs).

References

External links 
 Airwallex Pty Ltd

Financial services companies of Australia
Financial services companies of Hong Kong
Financial services companies established in 2015
Online financial services companies of Australia
Electronic funds transfer
Financial technology companies
Payment service providers
Merchant services